The Three Around Christine (German: Die Drei um Christine) is a 1936 German comedy film directed by Hans Deppe and starring Maria Andergast, Hans Söhnker and Fritz Kampers. It was made at the Bavaria Studios in Munich. The film's sets were designed by the art director Max Seefelder.

Cast
 Maria Andergast as Christine Biehler  
 Hans Söhnker as Eggert  
 Fritz Kampers as Bachmoser - Bürgermeister 
 Gustav Waldau as Traugott  
 Georg Vogel as Balther  
 Lola Chlud as Hella  
 Ernst Behmer as Barbier  
 Käthe Braun as Bärble  
 Elise Aulinger as Ursl  
 Justus Paris as Hornerer  
 Philipp Weichand as Stolzinger  
 Beppo Brem as Matthias 
 Kurt Hagen 
 Franz Koch

References

Bibliography 
 Jill Nelmes & Jule Selbo. Women Screenwriters: An International Guide. Palgrave Macmillan, 2015.

External links 
 

1936 films
Films of Nazi Germany
German comedy films
1936 comedy films
1930s German-language films
Films directed by Hans Deppe
German black-and-white films
Bavaria Film films
Films shot at Bavaria Studios
1930s German films